Miss Paraguay is a national Beauty pageant in Paraguay. The contest has responsibility to select its winner to the Miss Universe. In addition, delegates for regional competitions are also selected such as Reina Hispanoamericana, Miss Continente Americano and Miss América Latina.

History

Miss Paraguay
The Miss Paraguay beauty pageant, created in 1957 dictator of Stroessner and Secretary of Tourism Paraguay then in 1990 Guillermo Rolon (President of Miss Paraguay) and Canal 9 took over Miss Paraguay until 2001, nowadays sends delegates to Reinado Internacional del Café held annually in Colombia, Miss Ambar Mundial, Miss Teen Panamericana, Miss Intercontinental, and Miss Globe International held each year in the eastern Mediterranean region. It was not held in 1959, 1968, 1969, 2002, 2003, 2006, 2007 and 2008. In the 1996 edition of the Miss Ambar Mundial Pageant was Adriana Baum of Paraguay was winner, she was also the winner of the 1997 Miss Teen Panamericana pageant. The pageant stopped sending representatives for Miss Universe after 2001.

Reinas de Belleza del Paraguay
In 2008 Miss Universo Paraguay changed as Bellezas del Paraguay. Between 2009 and 2012 returned as Miss Universo Paraguay for the second time. Between 2013 and 2014 the name of pageant renamed as Nuestra Belleza del Paraguay. Began 2015 the format has changed to be Reinas de Belleza del Paraguay national contest. This pageant automatically produces the main winners to Miss World, Miss Universe, Miss International, Miss Earth and Miss Supranational. In 2016 Reinas de Belleza del Paraguay divided to two national pageants of equal standing which are Miss Universo Paraguay (Miss Universe Paraguay) and Miss Mundo Paraguay (Miss World Paraguay). The selection for these contests happens in parallel, with each regional contest choosing one delegate for the Miss Universe Paraguay contest and one for the Miss World Paraguay contest. In the finale, the two contests occur in separate segments, with a finalist or runner up from the Miss World Paraguay group being chosen for Miss Earth (Miss Tierra Paraguay) and a runner up or finalist from the Miss Universe Paraguay contest being chosen for Miss International (Miss Internacional Paraguay), although this can vary. This production collaborates with MGM Producciones in Asuncion.

Titleholders

Department rankings

Representatives to international beauty pageants
The following women have represented Paraguay in the Big Four international beauty pageants, the four major international beauty pageants for women. These are Miss World, Miss Universe, Miss International and Miss Earth.

Miss Universo Paraguay

Between 1957 and 2001 the winners of Miss Paraguay contest went to Miss Universe. Began in 2004 the new management of Promociones Gloria from Bolivia takes over Miss Universe franchise for Paraguay. The winner of Reinas de Belleza del Paraguay goes to Miss Universe pageant. On occasion, when the winner does not qualify (due to age) for either contest, a runner-up is sent.

Miss Mundo Paraguay

The second title of Reinas de Belleza del Paraguay represents her country at Miss World. In recent years the Miss Mundo Paraguay holds to choose a Miss World Paraguay winner in separate formation but is in the one contest of Reinas de Belleza del Paraguay pageant.

Miss Internacional Paraguay

The third title of Reinas de Belleza del Paraguay represents her country at Miss International. In recent years Miss Internacional paraguay awarded to 1st Runner-up when the license does not group to Big Four pageants. As tradition Top 3 will be sent to Miss Universe, Miss World and Miss International respectively.

Miss Tierra Paraguay 

Since 2002 the Promociones Gloria from Bolivia takes over Miss Earth franchise for Paraguay. The runner-up or even winner may compete at the Miss Earth but traditionally the third runner-up went to Miss Earth pageant. Nowadays after a new formation debuted the representative of Paraguay at Miss Earth will be designated to one of runners-up of Reinas de Belleza del Paraguay.

See also
Miss Universe
Miss World
Miss International
Miss Earth
Miss América Latina
Reina Hispanoamericana
Miss Continente Americano

References

External links
 Miss Paraguay Official Website

 
Beauty pageants in Paraguay
Recurring events established in 1957
1957 establishments in Paraguay
Paraguayan awards